The torpedo punt (also known as screw punt or spiral punt) is a type of punt kick implemented in Australian rules football, Rugby union & Rugby league, and more generally with an ellipsoidal football. The torpedo punt is the longest type of punt kick. It is also the predominant form of punt used in gridiron football codes.

In flight, the ball spins about its long axis, instead of end over end (as the drop punt does) or not at all (as a typical punt kick does), making the flight of the ball more aerodynamic, but more difficult to catch (or mark in some football codes). The pointier ends make the ball easier to catch in American Football.  With extra distance, this type of kick is also more difficult to accurately judge depth. If kicked correctly, an Australian football can travel up to 80 metres, while a normal punt will travel slightly less far. 

In Australian rules football, the kick has become less common since the 1980s, as modern tactics have meant that accuracy has become typically more important than distance in field kicking; as such, coaches now prefer the use of the drop punt, and discouraging the use of the torpedo in general field play as a comparatively low percentage kick. The kick may still be seen when a player needs additional distance.

In the Rugby codes the kick is rarely used. It is used in the back line as a clearing kick.

Australian rules footballer Gordon Rattray, who played his football with the Fitzroy Football Club between 1917 and 1928, is credited as the first player to use the torpedo punt in that code. Alex Moffat is credited with creating the torpedo punt in the United States.

See also

 Drop Punt
 Checkside punt
 Snap kick
 Drop kick
 Punt Kick (American football)
 Bomb Kick
 Grubber kick

Footnotes

External links
YouTube video of Brendon Goddard's torpedo punt v Freo, Subiaco 2006

Australian rules football terminology
Rugby league terminology
Australian rules football skills